Anders Kobro is a Norwegian drummer who played in the bands In the Woods... and Green Carnation. He was also playing for Carpathian Forest until 2014 .

Early life
Anders Kobro was born in Kristiansand, Norway on 10 June 1975. Kobro began playing in a band called Green Carnation, which later changed its name into In the Woods, when he was 14.

With Carpathian Forest
Anders Kobro's first collaboration with Carpathian Forest was the debut liveshow for the band at the Quart Festival 1998 in Kristiansand together with Immortal and Satyricon on the bill. Two weeks later Carpathian Forest played at Under the Black Sun festival in Germany. After these two shows Carpathian Forest agreed on continue the work together, so in October 1998 R. Nattefrost, J. Nordavind, Tchort and A. Kobro got together a Friday afternoon in Soundsuite studio with Terje Refnes and much alcohol. The result of that session was the 7-inch He's Turning Blue/Ghoul (Mayhem cover) featured on Tribute to Mayhem album released by Avantgarde Music. One year later the band again entered Soundsuite studio (with Terje Refsnes) and recorded the album Strange Old Brew, and Morbid Fascinations of Death also released on Avantgarde Music.

References
http://metal-maniac.com/an-interview-with-anders-kobro/

Living people
Norwegian heavy metal drummers
Male drummers
1975 births
Carpathian Forest members
21st-century Norwegian drummers
21st-century Norwegian male musicians
Musicians from Kristiansand